The Tabqa Dam, or al-Thawra Dam as it is also named (literally "Dam of the Revolution"), most commonly known as Euphrates Dam, is an earthen dam on the Euphrates, located  upstream from the city of Raqqa in Raqqa Governorate, Syria. The city of Al-Thawrah is located immediately south of the dam. Its construction led to the creation of Lake Assad, Syria's largest water reservoir. The dam was constructed between 1968 and 1973 with help from the Soviet Union. At the same time, an international effort was made to excavate and document as many archaeological remains as possible in the area of the future lake before they would be flooded by the rising water. When the flow of the Euphrates was reduced in 1974 to fill the lake behind the dam, a dispute broke out between Syria and Iraq (which is downstream) that was settled by intervention from Saudi Arabia and the Soviet Union. The dam was originally built to generate hydroelectric power, as well as irrigate lands on both sides of the Euphrates. The dam has not reached its full potential in either of these objectives.

Project history
In 1927, when Syria was a French mandate, it was proposed to build a dam in the Euphrates near the Syria–Turkey border. After Syria became independent in 1946, the feasibility of this proposal was re-investigated, but the plan was not carried out. In 1957, the Syrian government reached an agreement with the Soviet Union for technical and financial aid for the construction of a dam in the Euphrates. Syria, as part of the United Arab Republic (UAR), signed an agreement with West Germany in 1960 for a loan to finance the construction of the dam. After Syria left the UAR in 1961, a new agreement about the financing of the dam was reached with the Soviet Union in 1965. A special government department was created in 1961 to oversee the construction of the dam. In the early 1960s Swedish geomorphologist Åke Sundborg worked as an advisor on the dam project with the task of estimating the amount and fate of sediments that would enter into the dam. Sundborg developed for this purpose a mathematical model on the projected growth of a river delta in the dam.

Originally, the Tabqa Dam was conceived as a dual-purpose dam. Construction of the dam lasted between 1968 and 1973, while the accompanying power station was finished on 8 March 1978. The dam was constructed during the agricultural reform policies of Hafez al-Assad, who had re-routed the Euphrates river for the dam in 1974. The total cost of the dam was US$340 million of which US$100 million was in the form of a loan by the Soviet Union. The Soviet Union also provided technical expertise. During construction, up to 12,000 Syrians and 900 Russian technicians worked on the dam. They were housed in the greatly expanded town near the construction site, which was subsequently renamed Al-Thawrah. To facilitate the project, as well as the construction of irrigation works on the Khabur River, the national railway system (Chemins de Fer Syriens) was extended from Aleppo to the dam, Raqqa, Deir ez-Zor, and eventually Qamishli. Around 4,000 Arab families who had been living in the flooded part of the Euphrates Valley were resettled in other parts of northern Syria, part of a partially implemented plan to establish an "Arab belt" along the borders with Turkey and Iraq in order to separate Kurds in Syria from Turkish and Iraqi Kurdistan.

Dispute with Iraq
In 1974, the authorities started to fill the lake behind the dam by reducing the flow of the Euphrates. Slightly earlier, the Turkish government had started filling the reservoir of the newly constructed Keban Dam, and at the same time the area was hit by significant drought. Iraq asked the Arab League to intervene but Syria argued that it received less water from Turkey as well. As a result, tensions rose; both governments sent troops to the Syria-Iraq border, and the Iraqi government threatened to bomb the Tabqa Dam. Before the dispute could escalate any further, an agreement was reached in 1975 after mediation by Saudi Arabia and the Soviet Union, whereby Syria immediately increased the flow from the dam and agreed to let 60 percent of the Euphrates water that came over the Syria-Turkey border flow into Iraq.

Rescue excavations in the Lake Assad region
The upper part of the Syrian Euphrates valley has been intensively occupied at least since the Late Natufian period (10,800–9500 BC). Nineteenth- and early twentieth-century European travellers had already noted the presence of numerous archaeological sites in the area that would be flooded by the new reservoir. In order to preserve or at least document as many of these remains as possible, an extensive archaeological rescue programme was initiated during which more than 25 sites were excavated.

Between 1963 and 1965, archaeological sites and remains were located with the help of aerial photographs, and a ground survey was carried out as well to determine the periods that were present at each site. Between 1965 and 1970, foreign archaeological missions carried out systematic excavations at the sites of Mureybet (United States), Tell Qannas (Habuba Kabira) (Belgium), Mumbaqa (Germany), Selenkahiye (Netherlands), and Emar (France). With help from UNESCO, two minarets at Mureybet and Meskene were photogrammetrically measured, and a protective glacis was built around the castle Qal'at Ja'bar. The castle was located on a hilltop that would not be flooded, but the lake would turn it in an island. The castle is now connected to the shore by a causeway.

In 1971, with support from UNESCO, Syria appealed to the international community to participate in the efforts to salvage as many archaeological remains as possible before the area would disappear under the rising water of Lake Assad. To stimulate foreign participation, the Syrian antiquities law was modified so that foreign missions had the right to claim a part of the artefacts that were found during excavation. As a result, between 1971 and 1977, numerous excavations were carried out in the Lake Assad area by Syrian as well as foreign missions. Syrian archaeologists worked at the sites of Tell al-'Abd, 'Anab al-Safinah, Tell Sheikh Hassan, Qal'at Ja'bar, Dibsi Faraj and Tell Fray. There were missions from the United States on Tell Hadidi (Azu), Dibsi Faraj, Tell Fray and Shams ed-Din-Tannira; from France on Mureybet and Emar; from Italy on Tell Fray; from the Netherlands on Tell Ta'as, Jebel 'Aruda and Selenkahiye; from Switzerland on Tell al-Hajj; from Great Britain on Abu Hureyra and Tell es-Sweyhat; and from Japan on Tell Roumeila. In addition, the minarets of Mureybet and Meskene were moved to higher locations, and Qal'at Ja'bar was further reinforced and restored. Many finds from the excavations are now on display in the National Museum of Aleppo, where a special permanent exhibition is devoted to the finds from the Lake Assad region.

Other dams in the Syrian Euphrates valley
After the completion of the Tabqa Dam, Syria built two more dams in the Euphrates, both of which were functionally related to the Tabqa Dam. Its construction was partly motivated by the disappointing performance of the Tabqa Dam. The implementation of a fourth dam between Raqqa and Deir ez-Zor – the Halabiye Dam – was planned in 2009 and an appeal to archaeologists was released to excavate sites that will be flooded by the new reservoir.

Recent history

On 11 February 2013 the dam was captured by the Syrian opposition in their fight against the government, according to The Syrian Observatory for Human Rights. In 2013, four of the dam's eight turbines were operational and the original staff continued to manage it. Dam workers still received pay from the Syrian Government, and fighting in the area temporarily ceased if repairs were needed. The dam was then captured by the Islamic State of Iraq and the Levant in 2014. SDF efforts to retake parts of the Al-Raqqa and Deir ez-Zor Governorates, including the area immediately surrounding the dam, began in November 2016. Interruptions in power output from the dam due to combat are estimated to have affected up to 40,000 people. 

In January 2017 the Euphrates rose 10 meters due to heavy precipitation and flow mismanagement, disrupting transportation and flooding farmland downstream. A nearby raid against ISIL by combined SDF and US special forces also impacted the dam's entrance. 

In March 2017, ISIL warned of the dam's imminent collapse after the towers attached to the dam were bombed by an American B-52 bomber during a joint US/SDF operation to capture it on March 26, 2017. The dam had been on a U.S. no-strike list but was struck by three bombs anyway. The bombing caused critical equipment to fail and the dam to stop functioning. One of the bombs, a bunker buster, failed to detonate. An emergency ceasefire between the Islamic State, US forces, and the Syrian government, otherwise sworn enemies, enabled engineers to make emergency repairs to the dam to prevent it from failing while the Turkish authorities coordinated to close the gates of dams upstream in order to prevent overtopping. A US drone strike killed three of the civilian emergency dam workers shortly thereafter. On March 29 a floodgate was opened by emergency workers, causing flooding downstream which displaced approximately 3,000 people. A second floodgate was opened on April 5, mitigating risk of collapse. If the dam had failed major flooding would have extended past Deir ez-Zor, more than 100 miles downstream. SDF forces announced they captured the dam on 10 May 2017.

Characteristics of the dam and the reservoir

The hydroelectric power station is located on the southern end of the dam and contains eight Kaplan turbines. The turbines' rotation speed is 125 RPM, and they can potentially generate 103 MW each. The reservoir can potentially hold  of water, at which size its surface area would be . Annual evaporation is  due to the high average summer temperature in northern Syria. This is high compared to reservoirs upstream from Lake Assad.

Neither the Tabqa Dam nor Lake Assad is currently used to its full economic potential. The proposed irrigation scheme suffered from a number of problems, including the high gypsum content in the reclaimed soils around Lake Assad, soil salinization, the collapse of canals that distributed the water from Lake Assad, and the unwillingness of farmers to resettle in the reclaimed areas. As a result, only  were irrigated from Lake Assad in 1984. Due to lower than expected water flow from Turkey, as well as lack of maintenance, the dam generates only 150 MW instead of 800 MW. The lake also supports a fishing industry.

Environmental effects

Research indicates that the salinity of the Euphrates water in Iraq has increased considerably since the nearly simultaneous construction of the Keban Dam in Turkey and the Tabqa Dam in Syria. This increase can, among other things, be related to the lower discharge of the Euphrates as a result of the construction of the Keban Dam and the dams of the Southeastern Anatolia Project (GAP) in Turkey, and to a lesser degree of the Tabqa Dam in Syria. High-salinity water is less useful for domestic and irrigation purposes.

The  shore of the lake has developed into an important marshland area. On the southeastern shore, some areas have been reforested with evergreen trees including the Aleppo pine and the Euphrates poplar. Lake Assad is an important wintering location for migratory birds and the government has undertaken measures to protect small areas along the shores of Lake Assad from hunters by downgrading access roads. The island of Jazirat al-Thawra has been designated a nature reserve.

See also

Water resources management in Syria
Baath Dam

References

Notes

Hydroelectric power stations in Syria
Dams in Syria
Soviet Union–Syria relations
Dams on the Euphrates River
Buildings and structures in Raqqa Governorate
Earth-filled dams
Dams completed in 1973
1973 establishments in Syria
Energy infrastructure completed in 1977
Soviet foreign aid
Crossings of the Euphrates
Iraq–Syria relations